Nadeshda Brennicke (born 21 April 1973 in Freiburg im Breisgau; also known as Nadja Therésa Brennicke) is a German actress, singer and author.

Biography
Brennicke is the adoptive daughter of TV and voice-over actor Michael Brennicke and her mother is an art dealer. She spent her childhood in München. When she was 15 she left gymnasium when she was in the tenth grade and moved out of her parents home in hopes of becoming an actress.

From 1989-91, she attended the Zinner Studio (today the International School for Acting and Acting). In 1992 she formed the singing duo Charade with Jennifer Böttcher, which was produced by Stefan Zauner and Aron Strobel of the band Münchener Freiheit. The singles All of You and The Colour of Your Eyes reached number 67 and 60 of the German charts.

In her senior year of drama school Brennicke received the lead role of Tina in the German film comedy Manta – Der Film. Other performances for television productions followed. She gained more recognition for her role as investigator Tessa Norman in the series The Streets of Berlin.

She sings and composes her own songs; she sang among others credits in the Polizeiruf 110 episode Silicone Walli and in the film Antibodies.

Personal life
Brennicke has one son Nikita who was born in 1997 whom she raised as a single mother. Between 2007 and 2020, Brennicke lived on a farm in Brandenburg where she raises Arabian thoroughbred horses, oriental cats and a Great Dane.

She was in a relationship for two years (2012-14) with Vietnamese cameraman 
Ngô Thế Châu.

Filmography

Film

Television

Honors 
 2001: Adolf-Grimme-Preis, Audience prize of the Marler Gruppe for the role of Anne Schneider in Das Phantom
 2013: Silver Hugo for Best Actress Chicago International Film Festival for the role of Gisela Werler in Banklady
 2014: Nominated for the Best German Actress at the Bambi 2014 for the role of Gisela Werler in Banklady
 2014: Insigne de Cristal de la Meilleure Actrice award for Best Actress at the Festival International du Film Policier de Liège in Lüttich for the leading role in Banklady

References

External links 

 Official website of Nadeshda Brennicke

Living people
1973 births
21st-century German actresses
20th-century German actresses
German film actresses
German television actresses
Actors from Freiburg im Breisgau
21st-century German women singers
Musicians from Freiburg im Breisgau